Sunan Shuofang International Airport  is an airport serving the cities of Wuxi and Suzhou in southern Jiangsu Province, China (Sunan meaning "Southern Jiangsu" in Chinese). The airport was built in 1955 for military use, and commercial flights only started in 2004. Formerly called Wuxi Shuofang Airport, it took the current name in November 2010 and is now co-owned by the governments of Wuxi, Suzhou, and Jiangsu Province. In 2013, Sunan Shuofang Airport handled 3,590,188 passengers, making it the 42nd busiest airport in China.

Facilities
The airport has one runway designated 03/21 which measures .

Future planning and construction of the second runway.

Airlines and destinations

Passenger

Cargo

Ground transportation
The airport is served by a station on Line 3 of the Wuxi Metro.

See also

 List of airports in China
 List of the busiest airports in China

References

External links
Official website

Airports in Jiangsu
Transport in Wuxi
Transport in Suzhou
Airports established in 1955
1955 establishments in China